William Rodman Henry (October 15, 1927 – April 11, 2014) was an American professional baseball player. He was nicknamed "Gabby" by teammates for his quiet nature.

After playing college baseball for the Houston Cougars, he began his career for the Red Sox in 1952, and was primarily a starter for the team.  Henry was the first from the University of Houston's baseball history to make it to the Major League.  After a two-year absence from the Major Leagues, he returned to MLB as a relief pitcher for the Cubs in 1958. He would only make 2 starts the rest of his career.

As a reliever, Henry amassed 90 saves.  He appeared in the 1960 All-Star Game, and pitched in the 1961 World Series while on the Cincinnati Reds.

Henry was released by the Houston Astros on June 28, 1969, ending his Major League career.

Henry was a victim of identity theft and his death was erroneously reported in August 2007 in a news story that was widely circulated. He was contacted by baseball historian David Allen Lambert who first reported his false death report to him.  He resided in Deer Park, Texas, near Houston.  Bill Henry's story appeared in Sports Illustrated in Rick Reilly's "Life of Reilly" column entitled "The Passing of a Counterfeit Bill" (September 24, 2007, p. 76).

He died as a result of heart problems at the age of 86 on April 11, 2014 in Round Rock, Texas.

See also

References

External links
  
Tampa Tribune - September 7, 2007
Dallas Morning News - September 15, 2007
Houston Chronicle - September 5, 2007
 Lakeland Ledger - September 5, 2007
Bill Henry at Baseball Almanac
Pasadena Citizen - April 14, 2014
Pasadena Independent School District - April 16, 2014

1927 births
2014 deaths
Baseball players from Texas
Boston Red Sox players
Charleston Senators players
Chicago Cubs players
Cincinnati Reds players
Clarksdale Planters players
Greenville Majors players
Houston Astros players
Houston Cougars baseball players
Louisville Colonels (minor league) players
Major League Baseball pitchers
Memphis Chickasaws players
National League All-Stars
Ohio State League players
People from Alice, Texas
People from Deer Park, Texas
Pittsburgh Pirates players
Portland Beavers players
San Diego Padres (minor league) players
San Francisco Giants players
San Francisco Seals (baseball) players
Shreveport Sports players
Sportspeople from Harris County, Texas